The Comparative and International Law Journal of Southern Africa is a peer-reviewed law journal published by the Institute of Foreign and Comparative Law, University of South Africa.

South African law journals
Triannual journals
English-language journals
Publications established in 1968
University of South Africa